"When It Started" is a song by the garage rock band The Strokes. It appears in the film Spider-Man as well as the film's soundtrack. Due to the September 11 terrorist attacks in New York City the song replaced "New York City Cops" on the US version of the album Is This It after The Strokes witnessed the "valiant response" of the city's police department during the tragedy. The vinyl release retained the original track list. The song would later appear on the soundtrack album Music from and Inspired by Spider-Man (2002).

References

2001 songs
The Strokes songs
Songs written by Julian Casablancas